Masuo Station is the name of two train stations in Japan:

 Masuo Station (Mie) (益生駅)
 Masuo Station (Chiba) (増尾駅)